The 1994 World Weightlifting Championships were held at the Abdi İpekçi Arena in Istanbul, Turkey from 17 to 27 November 1994.

Medal summary

Men

Women

Medal table
Ranking by Big (Total result) medals 

Ranking by all medals: Big (Total result) and Small (Snatch and Clean & Jerk)

References
Results (Sport 123)
Weightlifting World Championships Seniors Statistics

External links
Database

W
World Weightlifting Championships
World Weightlifting Championships
Sports competitions in Istanbul
World
World Weightlifting Championships, 1994
World Weightlifting Championships